The United Patriots (OP) was a nationalist electoral alliance in Bulgaria formed by three political parties: IMRO – Bulgarian National Movement (IMRO), Attack (until 25 July 2019), and the National Front for the Salvation of Bulgaria (NFSB).

The coalition between the three parties was created by the agreement put forward a joint candidacy for the 2016 presidential election. The coalition's candidates for president and vice president were the then Deputy Chairmen of the National Assembly Krasimir Karakachanov (for President) and Yavor Notev (for Vice President).

On July 25, 2019, Volen Siderov, Desislav Chukolov and Pavel Shopov were expelled from the parliamentary group.

The coalition was part of the Third Borisov Government.
All parties in the coalition were defeated in the 2021 Bulgarian parliamentary election and failed to gain any seats in the National Assembly.

Electoral history

See also
 Patriotic Front (Bulgaria) Nationalist electoral alliance (2016–2017)

References

2016 establishments in Bulgaria
2021 disestablishments in Bulgaria
Defunct political party alliances in Bulgaria
Eastern Orthodox political parties
National conservative parties
Nationalist parties in Bulgaria
Political parties disestablished in 2021
Political parties established in 2016
Right-wing populism in Bulgaria
Right-wing populist parties
Right-wing parties in Europe